Jonathan Haradan (November 11, 1744 – November 23, 1803) was a privateer during the American Revolution.

Biography 
Haradan was born in 1744 in Gloucester, Massachusetts. As a boy he worked in Salem for the prominent merchant and future Senator George Cabot. He joined the Massachusetts State Navy in July 1776 as First Lieutenant of the sloop-of-war Tyrannicide, fourteen guns. On board for two years, he captured many prizes, becoming her commander in 1777. The ship was scuttled during the Penobscot Expedition.

In 1778, Haraden began his career as a privateersman, commanding the General Pickering, sloop of fourteen guns. On October 13, 1779, he engaged three British privateers off New Jersey simultaneously and captured a twenty-two gun sloop in the Bay of Biscay. When the larger British privateer, Achilles of forty guns, attempted to recapture the sloop a few days later, Haraden forced it to disengage after three hours' action at close quarters. In 1781, he was briefly captured by Admiral George Rodney in the West Indies, but escaped. Haraden sailed privateer Julius Caesar in 1782.

After the War of Independence, Haraden's health deteriorated steadily. He died in Salem, Massachusetts in 1803. He was buried in Salem's Broad Street Cemetery.

Legacy 
 Two destroyers of the United States Navy have been named USS Haraden for him.

References 

 

1744 births
1803 deaths
United States Navy personnel of the American Revolution
People of Massachusetts in the American Revolution
American privateers